The Kiko is a breed of meat goat originating from New Zealand. Kiko comes from the Māori word for meat. The Kiko breed was developed in the 1980s by Garrick and Anne Batten, who cross-bred local feral goats with imported dairy goat bucks of the Anglo-Nubian, Saanen, and Toggenburg breeds. The only aims of the breeding programme were fast rate of growth and ability to survive in the pastoral conditions of the New Zealand hill country.

The Kiko breed was imported into the United States in 1992 by Goatex Group LLC. Today, three registries exist in the US for Kikos: the AKGA, the IKGA, and the NKR, the latter of which is the largest of the three. Through these agencies, Kikos could be registered as 100% New Zealand, meaning that their lineage can be traced all the way back to the original New Zealand stock. "Purebreds" refer to goats that are at least 15/16ths New Zealand stock and "percentages" are those that are at least 50% New Zealand stock. Kiko-Boer crosses can also be registered as Genemaster™ through the NKR.

References 

Goat breeds
Meat goat breeds
Goat breeds originating in New Zealand